O'Ceann is an Irish name.

The O'Ceanns are first found in Derry where they held a family seat from very ancient times.

Spelling variations include:
Cain, Caine, Kane, Cahan, O'Cahan, Kean, Keane, O'Keane, Ceane, Cean, Kahan, O'Kean, O'Kane, O'Kaine, Kaine, Keann, Cainn, Cainne, Kainne, Kainn, Cahann, O'Cain and many other.

See also
Irish name

External links
http://www.houseofnames.com/coatofarms_details.asp?sId=&s=O%27Ceann

OCeann

nl:Ierse namen